The Pilgrim Hall Museum at 75 Court Street in Plymouth, Massachusetts is the oldest public museum in the United States in continuous operation, having opened in 1824.

History
The Pilgrim Society, established in 1820, runs the museum. The museum tells the story of the Pilgrims and Plymouth Colony. Architect Alexander Parris designed the museum building, which is built of Quincy granite and opened in 1824. Russell Warren constructed a wooden portico in 1834, which had Doric columns supporting a triangular pediment.  The museum was extensively upgraded in the 1880s, and a library wing added in 1904.  In 1922 the original wooden portico was replaced by the present six-column Greek Revival temple front, which was designed by McKim Mead & White. In 2008, an addition was added to the museum along with a new sign, activities, and advertising throughout the downtown area. In 2018, John Canning & Co., an architectural arts restoration company out of Cheshire, Connecticut, was hired to restore and preserve the finishes throughout the Steinway Library. The project included the conservation and restoration of the Guastavino tile ceiling, plaster walls, and mosaic terrazzo floors. Its building was listed on the National Register of Historic Places in 1972.

Collections
The Pilgrim Hall Museum contains artifact collections, artwork, a library, and archives. Prominent pieces include original Pilgrim era artifacts, such as the original Brewster Chair and a 1651 portrait of Edward Winslow, the only known contemporaneous Pilgrim portrait. The museum owns the remnants of the Sparrow Hawk, the only known remains of a trans-Atlantic 17th-century ship, which wrecked off of Cape Cod in 1626. The Sparrow Hawk remnants are currently in storage. The top part of Plymouth Rock sat in front of the building from the 1830s to the 1880s, when it was reunited with the bottom half in the Plymouth waterfront. A portion of the Rock was retained at the museum where visitors are currently permitted to touch it.

Gallery

See also
National Register of Historic Places listings in Plymouth County, Massachusetts

References

Further reading

Sparrow Hawk

External links and references

 Pilgrim Hall Museum website

Museums on the National Register of Historic Places in Massachusetts
Infrastructure completed in 1824
Museums established in 1824
Museums in Plymouth, Massachusetts
History museums in Massachusetts
Plymouth Colony
National Register of Historic Places in Plymouth County, Massachusetts
1824 establishments in Massachusetts